Peritrechus is a genus of dirt-colored seed bugs in the family Rhyparochromidae. There are at least 20 described species in Peritrechus.

Species
These 20 species belong to the genus Peritrechus:

 Peritrechus angusticollis (Sahlberg, 1848) i c g
 Peritrechus convivus (Stål, 1851) i c g b
 Peritrechus dissimilis Horvath, G., 1895 c g
 Peritrechus femoralis Kerzhner, I.M., 1977 c g
 Peritrechus flavicornis Jakovlev, 1876 c g
 Peritrechus fraternus Uhler, 1871 i c g b
 Peritrechus geniculatus (Hahn, 1831) c g
 Peritrechus gracilicornis Puton, A., 1877 c g
 Peritrechus insignis Jakovlev, B.E., 1892 c g
 Peritrechus lundi Gmelin, 1790 c g
 Peritrechus meridionalis c g
 Peritrechus nubilus (Fallen, C.F., 1807) c g
 Peritrechus oculatus Jakovlev, B.E., 1885 c g
 Peritrechus paludemaris Barber, 1914 i c g
 Peritrechus pilosulus Scudder, 2000 i g
 Peritrechus pusillus Horvath, G., 1884 c g
 Peritrechus putoni Horvath, G., 1895 c g
 Peritrechus saskatchewanensis Barber, H.G., 1918 c g
 Peritrechus tristis Van Duzee, 1906 i c g b
 Peritrechus variegatus Kiritshenko, A.N., 1914 c g

Data sources: i = ITIS, c = Catalogue of Life, g = GBIF, b = Bugguide.net

References

Further reading

 
 
 
 

Rhyparochromidae
Articles created by Qbugbot